Miller's law can refer to three different principles.

In communication
Miller's law, part of his theory of communication, was formulated by George A. Miller (1920–2012), Professor of Psychology at Princeton University.

It instructs us to suspend judgment about what someone is saying so that we can first understand them without imbuing their message with our own personal interpretations. The law states:

In psychology
The observation, also by George A. Miller, that the number of objects the average person can hold in working memory is about seven. It was put forward in a 1956 edition of Psychological Review in a paper titled "The Magical Number Seven, Plus or Minus Two".

In software development
Miller's Law was formulated by Mike Beltzner and is named in respect of Dave Miller, long-standing owner of the Bugzilla product:

See also
 Principle of charity

References

Adages
Communication theory
Memory researchers